The 1952 NCAA Golf Championship was the 14th annual NCAA-sanctioned golf tournament to determine the individual and team national champions of men's collegiate golf in the United States.

The tournament was held at the Purdue University Golf Course in West Lafayette, Indiana.

Three-time defending champions North Texas State again won the team title, the Eagles' fourth NCAA team national title.

Individual results

Individual champion
 Jim Vickers, Oklahoma

Tournament medalist
 Paul Harney, Holy Cross (140)

Team results

Note: Top 10 only
DC = Defending champions

References

NCAA Men's Golf Championship
Golf in Indiana
NCAA Golf Championship
NCAA Golf Championship
NCAA Golf Championship